Xudafərin is a town in the Jabrayil District of Azerbaijan. The town is near the Khudaferin Bridges and the border with Iran.

References 

Populated places in Jabrayil District